Youth, a Narrative; and Two Other Stories is a collection of three works of short fiction, originally serialized in Blackwood’s Magazine. The volume was published in 1902 by William Blackwood and Sons.

The collection includes “Heart of Darkness”, considered one of the finest examples of modern fiction.

Stories

The three stories that appear in Youth, a Narrative were serialized in Blackwood’s Magazine previous to their collection. The month and date of their first serialization appears below after the title.

“ Youth” (September, 1898)
“Heart of Darkness” (February.-April 1899)
“The End of the Tether” (July–September, 1902)

Publication Background

After the success of the short story “Youth” in 1898, publisher William Blackwood offered to include the story in a collection if Conrad could publish two more works. Conrad consented and these stories were the material for this, his second volume of short fiction.

Footnotes

Sources 
Baines, Jocelyn. 1960. Joseph Conrad: A Critical Biography, McGraw-Hill Book Company, New York. 
Graver, Laurence]. 1969. Conrad’s Short Fiction. University of California Press, Berkeley, California. 
Watt, Ian. 1977. Impressionism and Symbolism in Heart of Darkness. The Southern Review, January 1977 in Joseph Conrad: Modern Critical Reviews, editor Harold Bloom. Chelsea House Publishers. 1987 pp. 83–99 

William Blackwood books
Works originally published in Blackwood's Magazine